Saint-Onésime-d'Ixworth is a municipality in the Canadian province of Quebec, located in the Kamouraska Regional County Municipality.

Municipal council
 Mayor: Jacques Dionne
 Councillors: Jean-Guy Beaulieu, Michèle Bond, Jean-Marie Dionne, Alfred Ouellet, Bertrand Ouellet, Isabelle Veilleux

See also
 List of municipalities in Quebec

References

Municipalities in Quebec
Incorporated places in Bas-Saint-Laurent